The Saint-Martin League (French: Ligue de Saint-Martin) is the top division of association football in the Collectivity of Saint Martin. The defending champions are Junior Stars FC, and the most successful club is ASC St. Louis Stars.

Stadia & locations

2020/21 teams

Concordia
Flamingo
Junior Stars
Orléans Attackers
Phoenicks
Saint-Louis Stars

Former teams

AS Portuguese - Saint-Barthélemy
Beach Hotel - Saint Barthélemy
Carcajou FC - Saint-Barthélemy
Etudiants - Saint-Barthélemy
FC ASCCO - Saint-Barthélemy
Young Stars - Saint-Barthélemy
Saint-Martin Mixte Stars - Saint-Martin
Tigers - Saint-Martin
Marigot - Saint-Martin
United Stars - Saint-Martin
Juventus de Saint-Martin - Saint-Martin

Champions per year

1970/71 : Junior Stars
1971/72 : Junior Stars
1972/73 : Junior Stars
1973/74 : Saint-Louis Stars
1974/75 : Saint-Louis Stars
1975/76 : Saint-Louis Stars
1976/77 : Saint-Louis Stars
1977/78 : Saint-Louis Stars
1978/79 : Saint-Louis Stars
1979/80 : Junior Stars
1980/81 : Junior Stars
1981/82 : Saint-Louis Stars
1982/83 : Saint-Louis Stars
1983/84 : Saint-Louis Stars
1984/85 : Saint-Louis Stars
1985/86 : Junior Stars
1986/87 : Saint-Louis Stars
1987/88 : Saint-Louis Stars
1988/89 : Saint-Louis Stars
1989/90 : Junior Stars
1990/91 : Junior Stars
1991/92 : Saint-Louis Stars
1992/93 : Saint-Louis Stars
1993/94 : Saint-Louis Stars
1994/95 : Saint-Louis Stars
1995/96 : Saint-Louis Stars
1996/97 : Saint-Louis Stars
1997/98 : Jah Rebels
1998/99 : Jah Rebels
1999/00 : Junior Stars
2000/01 : Saint-Louis Stars
2001/02 : Orléans Attackers
2002/03 : Junior Stars
2003/04 : Juventus de Saint-Martin
2004/05 : Orleans Attackers
2005/06 : Orleans Attackers
2006/07 : Orleans Attackers
2007/08 : Orleans Attackers
2008/09 : Saint-Louis Stars
2009/10 : Orleans Attackers
2010/11 : Junior Stars
2011/12 : Concordia
2012/13 : Orleans Attackers
2013/14 : Junior Stars
2014/15 : Orléans Attackers
2015/16 : FC Concordia 
2016/17 : Marigot
2017/18 : not held due to cyclones Irma and Maria
2018/19 : Junior Stars
2019/20 : not held due to Covid 19
2020/21 : Junior Stars

See also
Saint-Barthelemy Championships

References

External links
RSSSF
Saint-Martin Football Association

Football competitions in the Collectivity of Saint Martin
Football leagues in Overseas France
Top level football leagues in the Caribbean
Sports leagues established in 1970